Fondazione Cassa di Risparmio della Provincia dell'Aquila known as Fondazione Carispaq is an Italian charity organization that was the product of 1992 banking reform. The foundation was the owner of Cassa di Risparmio della Provincia dell'Aquila S.p.A.. However the limited company was sold to Banca Popolare dell'Emilia Romagna progressively from 2000 to 2013. Carispaq sold 11.853% shares of Carispaq for 1,915,453 new shares of BPER, which equivalent to 0.58% share capital as at 31 December 2014.

As at 31 December 2014, the foundation had a shareholders equity of €142,841,977. The foundation provided scholarship to the students of University of L'Aquila, as well as an archaeology scholarship  co-funded with Associazione L'ArQueologia. It was reported that the foundation promoted the construction of a L'Aquila–Rome railway.

References

External links
 

1992 establishments in Italy
Organizations established in 1992
Banking foundations based in Italy
Organisations based in L'Aquila
BPER Banca